Thank You, Mr. Moto may refer to:

 Thank You, Mr. Moto (novel), a 1936 spy novel by John P. Marquand
 Thank You, Mr. Moto (film), a 1937 film adaptation